Robert Weissberg (born 1941) was an American political scientist and writer. He was a professor of political science at the University of Illinois and was the author of twelve books on politics and pedagogy. He published numerous scientific papers in leading journals in political science. Weissberg has also written for magazines such as Forbes, Society, and The Weekly Standard. He was also a speaker at American Renaissance Magazine conferences where he was outspoken about his belief in the average mental differences between racial populations.

Education and academic career
Raised in Teaneck, New Jersey and a graduate of Teaneck High School, Weissberg earned an A.B. from Bard College and a Ph.D. in political science from the University of Wisconsin. He was an assistant professor at Cornell University and later associate professor and professor at the University of Illinois at Urbana-Champaign. He retired from the University of Illinois in 2003.

Reputation
In his 2010 book, Bad Students, Not Bad Schools Weissberg argued that students, rather than teachers or curriculum, are the root cause of poor educational outcomes. A review in the Journal of School Choice praised the book as bold and readable, but also criticized what the author viewed as occasionally an "intellectually lazy and (arguably) racist" argument.
Weissberg's  
In April 2012, in the wake of the John Derbyshire firing, National Review ended its relationship with Weissberg, noting that the editors only recently discovered that Weissberg had "participated in an American Renaissance conference where he delivered a noxious talk about the future of white nationalism".

Books
American Democracy: Theory & Reality (1972), ASIN B000SGT9O4.
Political Learning, Political Choice, & Democratic Citizenship (1974). .
Elementary Political Analysis (co-authored with Herbert Jacob) (1975). .
Public Opinion and Popular Government (1976). .
Understanding American Government (1979). ASIN B000OA72PM.
Political Tolerance: Balancing Community and Diversity (1998). .
The Politics of Empowerment (1999). .
Democracy and the Academy (2000). .
Polling, Policy, and Public Opinion: The Case Against Heeding the "Voice of the People" (2002). .
The Limits of Civic Activism: Cautionary Tales on the Use of Politics (2004). .
Pernicious Tolerance: How Teaching to "Accept Differences" Undermines Civil Society (2008). .
Bad Students, Not Bad Schools (2010). .

Articles
"Academic Deception for Fun and Profit". Telos 112 (Summer 1998). New York: Telos Press.
"The Perils of Keeping America America". Human Events August 25, 2004

Notes

1941 births
Living people
American political scientists
Bard College alumni
Cornell University faculty
Teaneck High School alumni
Race and intelligence controversy
University of Wisconsin–Madison College of Letters and Science alumni
University of Illinois Urbana-Champaign faculty
Writers from New Jersey